{{Infobox horseracing personality
|name  = Luis Saez
|image = Luis_Saez_at_Breeders_Cup_2018.jpg
|caption = Luis Saez at the 2018 Breeders' Cup
|occupation  = Jockey
|birth_place = Panama City, Panama
|birth_date  =  
|death_date  = 
|career wins  = 2,694+ (ongoing)
|race  = 

American Classics / Breeders' Cup:International races:|horses  = Essential Quality, Maximum Security, Mystic Guide, Will Take Charge
|updated = June 10, 2021
}}Luis Saez''' (born May 19, 1992) in Panama City, Panama) is a jockey in American Thoroughbred horse racing. Saez rode Maximum Security to finish first in the 2019 Kentucky Derby but was subsequently disqualified due to interference. The two later won the world's richest race, the $20,000,000 Saudi Cup, in 2020. Saez won his first Breeders' Cup race in 2020 and first American Classic in 2021, both with champion Essential Quality.

Background
Saez was born on May 19, 1992 in Panama City, Panama. He grew up on a farm and trained to be a jockey at the Laffit Pincay Jr. Jockey Training Academy in Panama. He rode 37 winners in Panama before relocating to the United States. His younger brother, Juan, also became a jockey but died in a riding accident at Indiana Grand in 2014. Saez dedicated his win in the 2021 Belmont Stakes to his brother.

Saez rides predominantly on the New York racing circuit and calls Belmont Park his second home.

Career
Saaz earned his first win in the United States on August 20, 2009 aboard Fearless Honor at Calder Race Track. His first stakes win was in 2009 in the Needles Stakes at Calder with Cinnamon Road. His first graded stakes win was in 2010 with Twilight Meteor in the Tropical Park Handicap, again at Calder.

In 2013, Saez scored his first Grade I win aboard Will Take Charge in the Travers Stakes. The two also won the Pennsylvania Derby and Clark Handicap, and finished second in the 2013 Breeders' Cup Classic. Will Take Charge earned the Eclipse Award as that year's Champion three-year-old colt.

Saez tied a Gulfstream Park record on January 24, 2018 when he rode seven winners on a single card. On November 9, 2018, he recorded his 2,000th win when he won the fourth race at Aqueduct on Y'allcomenow.

In 2019, Saez partnered with Maximum Security to wins in the Florida Derby, Haskell Invitational and Clark Handicap. These wins were overshadowed however by a controversial disqualification in the Kentucky Derby when Maximum Security swerved as the field turned for home with the colt on the lead. Saez said the horse had reacted to noise from the infield crowd, but was immediately brought under control. However, the swerve affected several horses behind him and could have caused a major accident if he had clipped heels with another horse. Saez was subsequently suspended for 15 days for "failure to control his mount". The two later won the world's richest race, the $20,000,000 Saudi Cup, in 2020, although the purse distribution was put on hold due to doping allegation's related to the horse's trainer.

In 2020, Saez partnered with Essential Quality to wins in the Breeders' Futurity and Breeders' Cup Juvenile, earning Saez his first win at the Breeders' Cup and the colt the Eclipse Award for champion two-year-old colt. In 2021, the two teamed up to win the Blue Grass and Belmont Stakes, the latter being Saez's first win of an American Triple Crown race.

Ranking

References

1992 births
Living people
American jockeys
People from Panama City
Panamanian jockeys